Gheorghe Simion (born 10 May 1957) is a Romanian boxer. He competed in the men's light middleweight event at the 1984 Summer Olympics. He also won one national senior title and one bronze medal at the European Amateur Boxing Championships.

References

External links
 
Gheorghe Simion at Olympedia.org

1957 births
Living people
Romanian male boxers
Olympic boxers of Romania
Boxers at the 1984 Summer Olympics
Place of birth missing (living people)
Light-middleweight boxers